Logaščica Creek is a stream that flows across the Logatec Karst Field and collects water from the western dolomite area of the karst field. Logaščica Creek starts at the confluence of Reka Creek and Black Creek in Gorenji Logatec and it sinks into the walled Jačka Sinkhole. The stream often floods. After it flows into the ground, it joins water from the Planina Karst Field and drains below the Logatec Karst Field towards Močilnik Springs and other sources of the Ljubljanica in Vrhnika.

References

External links
Logaščica Creek on Geopedija

Sinking rivers
Municipality of Logatec
Rivers of Inner Carniola